Collier Area Transit (CAT) is the public transportation system in Collier County, Florida. Regular transit bus service and the paratransit system are administered by the Collier County Department of Alternative Transportation Modes. Service is provided to Immokalee, Marco Island, Golden Gate and the City of Naples area, seven days a week from 6 a.m. to 7:30 p.m. depending on the route.

Routes 
, there are 21 bus routes.

References

Bus transportation in Florida
Transportation in Collier County, Florida
2001 establishments in Florida